Local elections were held in Romania on 10 June 2012. The Government initially tried to postpone the election to be on the same day with the 2012 Romanian legislative election, but a ruling of the Constitutional court made that option impossible. As of June 2011, a law was passed by the parliament, and promulgated by the president, in which the mayors and the presidents of the County Councils will be elected with in a First Past the Post system.

Will be elected:
 all the villages, communes, cities, and municipal councils (Local Councils), and the Sectors Local Councils of Bucharest
 the 41 County Councils, and the Bucharest Municipal General Council.
 the 41 Presidents of the County Councils
 all the mayors
 of the communes, cities, and municipalities
 of the Sectors of Bucharest
 The General Mayor of The Municipality of Bucharest

Results 

|-
|- style="background-color:#C9C9C9"
! style="background-color:#E9E9E9;text-align:center;" colspan=2 rowspan=2 | Party
! style="background-color:#E9E9E9;text-align:center;" colspan=3 | County CouncilsPresidents (PCJ)
! style="background-color:#E9E9E9;text-align:center;" colspan=3 | County Councilseats (CJ)
! style="background-color:#E9E9E9;text-align:center;" colspan=3 | Mayors (P)
! style="background-color:#E9E9E9;text-align:center;" colspan=3 | Local Councilsseats (CL)
|-
|- style="background-color:#C9C9C9"
! style="background-color:#E9E9E9;text-align:center;" |Votes
! style="background-color:#E9E9E9;text-align:center;" |%
! style="background-color:#E9E9E9;text-align:center;" |Seats
! style="background-color:#E9E9E9;text-align:center;" |Votes
! style="background-color:#E9E9E9;text-align:center;" |%
! style="background-color:#E9E9E9;text-align:center;" |Seats
! style="background-color:#E9E9E9;text-align:center;" |Votes
! style="background-color:#E9E9E9;text-align:center;" |%
! style="background-color:#E9E9E9;text-align:center;" |Seats
! style="background-color:#E9E9E9;text-align:center;" |Votes
! style="background-color:#E9E9E9;text-align:center;" |%
! style="background-color:#E9E9E9;text-align:center;" |Seats
|-
| 
| style="text-align:left;" | Social Liberal Union (PSD, PNL, and PC)  (Uniunea Social Liberală - USL)
| style="text-align:right;" | 4,260,709
| style="text-align:right;" | 49.71
| style="text-align:right;" | 36
| style="text-align:right;" | 4,203,007
| style="text-align:right;" | 49.68
| style="text-align:right;" | 723
| style="text-align:right;" | 2,782,792
| style="text-align:right;" | 33.99
| style="text-align:right;" | 1,292
| style="text-align:right;" | 2,630,123
| style="text-align:right;" | 32.74
| style="text-align:right;" | 12,668 	
|-
| 
| style="text-align:left;" | Social Democratic Party  (Partidul Social Democrat - PSD)
| style="text-align:right;" | —
| style="text-align:right;" | —
| style="text-align:right;" | 22
| style="text-align:right;" | 8,666
| style="text-align:right;" | 0.10
| style="text-align:right;" | 3
| style="text-align:right;" | 731,597
| style="text-align:right;" | 8.93
| style="text-align:right;" | 373
| style="text-align:right;" | 682,378
| style="text-align:right;" | 8.49
| style="text-align:right;" | 4,046
|-
| 
| style="text-align:left;" | Centre Right Alliance (PNL and PC)  (Alianța de Centru-Dreapta - ACD)
| style="text-align:right;" | —
| style="text-align:right;" | —
| style="text-align:right;" | 14
| style="text-align:right;" | —
| style="text-align:right;" | —
| style="text-align:right;" | —
| style="text-align:right;" | 52,938
| style="text-align:right;" | 0.64
| style="text-align:right;" | 27
| style="text-align:right;" | 43,532
| style="text-align:right;" | 0.54
| style="text-align:right;" | 244
|-
| 
| style="text-align:left;" | National Liberal Party  (Partidul Național Liberal - PNL)
| style="text-align:right;" | 9,249
| style="text-align:right;" | 0.10
| style="text-align:right;" | 13
| style="text-align:right;" | 4,755
| style="text-align:right;" | 0.05
| style="text-align:right;" | 2
| style="text-align:right;" | 586,050
| style="text-align:right;" | 7.15
| style="text-align:right;" | 263
| style="text-align:right;" | 532,488
| style="text-align:right;" | 6.63
| style="text-align:right;" | 3,101
|-
| 
| style="text-align:left;" | Conservative Party (Partidul Conservator)
| style="text-align:right;" | —
| style="text-align:right;" | —
| style="text-align:right;" | 1
| style="text-align:right;" | 611
| style="text-align:right;" | 0.00
| style="text-align:right;" | 0
| style="text-align:right;" | 62,591
| style="text-align:right;" | 0.76
| style="text-align:right;" | 14
| style="text-align:right;" | 69,687
| style="text-align:right;" | 0.86
| style="text-align:right;" | 381
|-
| 
| style="text-align:left;" |   (Partidul Democrat-Liberal - PDL)
| style="text-align:right;" | 1,268,611
| style="text-align:right;" | 14.80
| style="text-align:right;" | 2
| style="text-align:right;" | 1,289,680
| style="text-align:right;" | 15.24
| style="text-align:right;" | 212
| style="text-align:right;" | 1,241,802
| style="text-align:right;" | 15.17
| style="text-align:right;" | 488
| style="text-align:right;" | 1,116,312
| style="text-align:right;" | 13.89
| style="text-align:right;" | 6,155
|-
| 
| style="text-align:left;" | People's Party – Dan Diaconescu  (Partidul Poporului – Dan Diaconescu - PP-DD)
| style="text-align:right;" | 787,143
| style="text-align:right;" | 9.18
| style="text-align:right;" | 0
| style="text-align:right;" | 757,194
| style="text-align:right;" | 8.95
| style="text-align:right;" | 134
| style="text-align:right;" | 577,195
| style="text-align:right;" | 7.05
| style="text-align:right;" | 31
| style="text-align:right;" | 668,234
| style="text-align:right;" | 8.32
| style="text-align:right;" | 3,021
|-
| 
| style="text-align:left;" | Democratic Alliance of Hungarians in Romania  (Uniunea Democrată Maghiară din România - UDMR)
| style="text-align:right;" | 467,420
| style="text-align:right;" | 5.45
| style="text-align:right;" | 2
| style="text-align:right;" | 473,783
| style="text-align:right;" | 5.60
| style="text-align:right;" | 88
| style="text-align:right;" | 400,627
| style="text-align:right;" | 4.89
| style="text-align:right;" | 202
| style="text-align:right;" | 435,205
| style="text-align:right;" | 5.41
| style="text-align:right;" | 2,248
|-
| 
| style="text-align:left;" | National Union for the Progress of Romania (Uniunea Națională pentru Progresul României - UNPR)
| style="text-align:right;" | 168,900
| style="text-align:right;" | 1.97
| style="text-align:right;" | 1
| style="text-align:right;" | 204,083
| style="text-align:right;" | 2.41
| style="text-align:right;" | 13
| style="text-align:right;" | 205,274
| style="text-align:right;" | 2.50
| style="text-align:right;" | 24
| style="text-align:right;" | 218,465
| style="text-align:right;" | 2.72
| style="text-align:right;" | 972
|-
| 
| style="text-align:left;" |   (Partidul România Mare - PRM)
| style="text-align:right;" | 150,907
| style="text-align:right;" | 1.76
| style="text-align:right;" | 0
| style="text-align:right;" | 170,667
| style="text-align:right;" | 2.01
| style="text-align:right;" | 0
| style="text-align:right;" | 107,431
| style="text-align:right;" | 1.31
| style="text-align:right;" | 6
| style="text-align:right;" | 172,114
| style="text-align:right;" | 2.14
| style="text-align:right;" | 596
|-
| 
| style="text-align:left;" | Ecologist Party of Romania  (Partidul Ecologist Român - PER)
| style="text-align:right;" | 63,650
| style="text-align:right;" | 0.74
| style="text-align:right;" | 0
| style="text-align:right;" | 82,581
| style="text-align:right;" | 0.97
| style="text-align:right;" | 2
| style="text-align:right;" | 34,227
| style="text-align:right;" | 0.41
| style="text-align:right;" | 3
| style="text-align:right;" | 59,883
| style="text-align:right;" | 0.74
| style="text-align:right;" | 177
|-
| 
| style="text-align:left;" | Green Party  (Partidul Verde - PV)
| style="text-align:right;" | 80,697
| style="text-align:right;" | 0.94
| style="text-align:right;" | 0
| style="text-align:right;" | 63,508
| style="text-align:right;" | 0.75
| style="text-align:right;" | 0
| style="text-align:right;" | 24,131
| style="text-align:right;" | 0.29
| style="text-align:right;" | 2
| style="text-align:right;" | 39,199
| style="text-align:right;" | 0.48
| style="text-align:right;" | 113
|-
| 
| style="text-align:left;" | Democratic Forum of Germans in Romania  (Forumul Democrat al Germanilor din RomâniaDemokratischen Forums der Deutschen in Rumänien - FDGR/DFDR)
| style="text-align:right;" | 69,445
| style="text-align:right;" | 0.81
| style="text-align:right;" | 0
| style="text-align:right;" | 62,085
| style="text-align:right;" | 0.73
| style="text-align:right;" | 11
| style="text-align:right;" | 15,540
| style="text-align:right;" | 0.18
| style="text-align:right;" | 8
| style="text-align:right;" | 18,847
| style="text-align:right;" | 0.23
| style="text-align:right;" | 57
|-
| 
| style="text-align:left;" | Christian Democratic National Peasants' Party  (Partidul Național Țărănesc Creștin Democrat - PNȚCD)
| style="text-align:right;" | 31,077
| style="text-align:right;" | 0.36
| style="text-align:right;" | 0
| style="text-align:right;" | 44,733
| style="text-align:right;" | 0.52
| style="text-align:right;" | 0
| style="text-align:right;" | 19,910
| style="text-align:right;" | 0.24
| style="text-align:right;" | 3
| style="text-align:right;" | 38,549
| style="text-align:right;" | 0.47
| style="text-align:right;" | 142
|-
| 
| style="text-align:left;" |   (Partidul Noua Generație - Creștin Democrat - PNG)
| style="text-align:right;" | 8,377
| style="text-align:right;" | 0.09
| style="text-align:right;" | 0
| style="text-align:right;" | 17,702
| style="text-align:right;" | 0.20
| style="text-align:right;" | 0
| style="text-align:right;" | 12,033
| style="text-align:right;" | 0.14
| style="text-align:right;" | 1
| style="text-align:right;" | 26,381
| style="text-align:right;" | 0.32
| style="text-align:right;" | 108
|-
| 
| style="text-align:left;" | Other competitors
| style="text-align:right;" | 1,204,432
| style="text-align:right;" | 14.09
| style="text-align:right;" | 0
| style="text-align:right;" | 1,077,031
| style="text-align:right;" | 12.79
| style="text-align:right;" | 15
| style="text-align:right;" | 1,331,402
| style="text-align:right;" | 16.26
| style="text-align:right;" | 384
| style="text-align:right;" | 1,280,049
| style="text-align:right;" | 16.02
| style="text-align:right;" | 5,092
|-
| style="text-align:left;" colspan = 2 | Total: 
! style="text-align:right;" | 8,570,617
! style="text-align:right;" | 100
! style="text-align:right;" | 41
! style="text-align:right;" | 8,460,086
! style="text-align:right;" | 100
! style="text-align:right;" | 1,338
! style="text-align:right;" | 8,185,540
! style="text-align:right;" | 100
! style="text-align:right;" | 3,121
! style="text-align:right;" | 8,031,446
! style="text-align:right;" | 100
! style="text-align:right;" | 39,121
|-
| colspan = 2 style="text-align:left;" | Invalid votes
| style="text-align:right;" | 
| style="text-align:right;" | 
| style="text-align:right;" | —
| style="text-align:right;" | 
| style="text-align:right;" | 
| style="text-align:right;" | —
| style="text-align:right;" | 
| style="text-align:right;" | 
| style="text-align:right;" | —
| style="text-align:right;" | 
| style="text-align:right;" | 
| style="text-align:right;" | —
|-
| style="text-align:left;" colspan=20 | Notes
 PSD, PNL and PC ran as USL at county level and in the Capital, except in Covasna County, as well as in several other cities and communes. In some cities and communes the three parties ran in other alliances.
 PDL ran by itself and in various alliances with different parties through the country. The main color used was light green, despite the official colors still being orange and blue, as used in Cluj.
 Alliance between PNL and PC in some of the cities and communes.
 Including PDL in various alliances.
|-
| style="text-align:left;" colspan=20 | Source: Central Electoral Bureau provisional results 
|}

|-
|- style="background-color:#C9C9C9"
! style="background-color:#E9E9E9" align= center colspan=2 rowspan=2 | Party
! style="background-color:#E9E9E9" align= center colspan=3 | General Mayor ofBucharest (PGMB)
! style="background-color:#E9E9E9" align= center colspan=3 | General Council ofBucharest seats(CGMB)
|-
|- style="background-color:#C9C9C9"
! style="background-color:#E9E9E9" align= center |Votes
! style="background-color:#E9E9E9" align= center |%
! style="background-color:#E9E9E9" align= center |Seats
! style="background-color:#E9E9E9" align= center |Votes
! style="background-color:#E9E9E9" align= center |%
! style="background-color:#E9E9E9" align= center |Seats
|-
| 
| align = left  | Social Liberal Union  (Uniunea Social Liberală)  Sorin Oprescu
| align = right | 430,512
| align = right | 54.79
| align = right | 1
| align = right | 436,513
| align = right | 55.65
| align = right | 37
|-
| 
| align = left  |   (Partidul Democrat Liberal)  Silviu Prigoană
| align = right | 134,552
| align = right | 17.12
| align = right | 0
| align = right | 129,644
| align = right | 16.52
| align = right | 11
|-
| 
| align = left  | People's Party – Dan Diaconescu  (Partidul Poporului – Dan Diaconescu)  Horia Mocanu
| align = right | 74,290
| align = right | 9.45
| align = right | 0
| align = right | 83,764
| align = right | 10.67
| align = right | 7
|-
| 
| align = left  | Nicuşor Daniel Dan  (Independent)
| align = right | 66,649
| align = right | 8.48
| align = right | 0
| align = right | 36,948
| align = right | 4.71
| align = right | 0
|-
| 
| align = left  | National Union for the Progress of Romania  (Uniunea Națională pentru Progresul României)  Anghel Iordănescu
| align = right | 16,095
| align = right | 2.04
| align = right | 0
| align = right | 22,936
| align = right | 2.92
| align = right | 0
|-
| 
| align = left  |   (Partidul România Mare)  Petre Popeangă
| align = right | 8,913
| align = right | 1.13
| align = right | 0
| align = right | 14,984
| align = right | 1.91
| align = right | 0
|-
| 
| align = left  |   (Partidul Noua Generație - Creștin Democrat)  George Becali
| align = right | 25,076
| align = right | 3.19
| align = right | 0
| align = right | 12,279
| align = right | 1.56
| align = right | 0
|-
| 
| align = left  | Other competitors
| align = right | 29,652
| align = right | 3,77
| align = right | 0
| align = right | 47,299
| align = right | 6.03
| align = right | 
|-
| align=left colspan = 2 | Total: 
! align= right | 785,739
! align= right | 100
! align= right | 1
! align= right | 784,367
! align= right | 100
! align= right | 55
|-
| colspan = 2 align = left  | Invalid votes
| align = right | 
| align = right | 
| align = right | —
| align = right | 
| align = right | 
| align = right | —
|-
|align=left colspan=20 | Source: Central Electoral Bureau final results and attributed mandates
|}

Notes

 Sorin Oprescu ran as an independent for the seat of General Mayor of Bucharest, but was supported by the USL.

Electoral maps

References 

2012 in Romania
Local election, 2012
2012 elections in Romania
June 2012 events in Europe